Donus elegans is a species of true weevils in the tribe Hyperini.

References

External links 

 
 Donus elegans at insectoid.info
 Donus elegans at inpn.mnhn.fr

Beetles described in 1842
Hyperinae